Mordellapygium elongatum is a species of beetle in the genus Mordellapygium of the family Mordellidae. It was described in 1930.

References

Beetles described in 1930
Mordellidae